Alvin Snyder (March 31, 1936 – January 28, 2019) was an American journalist, author, and former Director of TV and Film Service at the United States Information Agency.

Early life
Snyder was born on March 31, 1936 in Trenton, New Jersey.

Career
Snyder started his career at CBS News in New York in 1959 as a news producer and was an editor on a documentary on Edward R. Murrow that won a Grammy award in 1967. He was later recruited by the Nixon White House and appointed Deputy Special Assistant by Richard Nixon to run TV operations in the newly established Office of Communications.

Alvin Snyder was featured on David Frost's series Playhouse Presents. "Nixon's the One," a reenactment using verbatim dialogue from the Nixon White House tapes, featured actor Ryan McLuskey as Snyder opposite Harry Shearer's Nixon during the President's resignation address.

USIA and KAL 007 role
Later he became a Director of TV and Film at the US Information Agency in Washington as an aide to Charles Z. Wick. A key contribution for Snyder at the USIA was documented after the downing of Korean Air Lines Flight 007. Snyder was credited with producing the video shown to the UN Security Council in 1983 that uncovered more evidence of Russia's role in the downing of the civilian aircraft.

Writing career
Later as a fellow at the Annenberg Foundation, he published a widely used text on the use of propaganda by the US Government. Snyder also served as a Senior Fellow for the University of Southern California Center for Public Diplomacy.

Snyder is also well-known for writing the book Warriors of Disinformation: American Propaganda, Soviet Lies, and the Winning of the Cold War (1995). In his 1995 memoir, he wrote that "the U.S. government ran a full-service public relations organization, the largest in the world, about the size of the twenty biggest U.S. commercial PR firms combined. Its full-time professional staff of more than 10,000 spread out among some 150 countries, burnished America‘s image and trashed the Soviet Union 2,500 hours a week with a tower of babble  more than 70 languages, to the tune of over $2 billion per year", and "the biggest branch of this propaganda machine" was the USIA.

Later life
Snyder died at the age of 82 in McLean, Virginia.

Publications

See also
United States Information Agency

References

1936 births
2019 deaths
People of the United States Information Agency
Writers from Trenton, New Jersey